Heavener  is a city in Le Flore County, Oklahoma, United States. It is part of the Fort Smith, Arkansas-Oklahoma Metropolitan Statistical Area. The population was 3,414 at the 2010 census, an increase of 6.7 percent from 3,201 at the 2000 census. Heavener is notable for the Heavener Runestone just outside the city limits.

History
Joseph H. Heavener and some other white settlers arrived, secured permits to farm from the Choctaw Indians and settled down to farm. In 1880, Zachary Taylor Ward and his Choctaw Indian wife, Tabitha Hickman Ward, moved their store at Skullyville to the present site of Heavener.  Ward died in 1883, and his widow, Tabitha, married Heavener. The couple owned the land on which the town was established. Prior to being named Heavener by a popular vote in 1895, the area was known by several different names, including Prairie of the Tall Grass, Choctaw City, Prairie View, Long Prairie, and Grand Prairie.

At the time of its founding, and through Oklahoma's statehood in 1907, Heavener was located in Sugar Loaf County, one of the counties making up the Moshulatubbee District of the Choctaw Nation.

Suitable agricultural land around Heavener attracted many farmers as settlers. Other improvements soon followed. A cotton gin and a grist mill were built in town in 1885. In 1896 the Kansas City, Pittsburg and Gulf Railroad built tracks through the town. A post office was established in a boxcar on May 12, 1896 while another boxcar became the train station. In 1900-1901 the Arkansas Western Railroad constructed tracks from Heavener east to Arkansas.

The Curtis Act allowed Heavener to incorporate in Indian Territory in 1898, with Henry Moore elected as the first mayor. The town population was 254 in 1900. After the Kansas City Southern Railway purchased the rail line in 1900,  the company established a roundhouse in 1910, making Heavener a division point. By 1910, the population was 780, and continued increasing to 1,850 in 1920.

Mining and timber became to the local economy in the 1930s. The 1930 census showed population of Heavener was 2,269. The Burnett Lumber Company opened a sawmill in 1935. Then the population began declining to 2,103 in 1950. A recovery began when the Heavener Charcoal Company began producing charcoal from its kilns in Heavener, shipping it to a plant in Arkansas. The 1970 census showed 2,566 residents in the town. However, the Burnett sawmill burned down in 1981.

Poultry farming became an important activity in the late 20th century. OK Foods established a hatchery in 1986. In 1992, the company built a poultry processing plant, and in 1995, it built a poultry feed mill.

Heavener Runestone

Heavener is best known for the Heavener Runestone just outside the city limits. The cryptic stone appears to have letters from the runic alphabet, which were possibly etched by pre-Columbian Norsemen. There is such an attraction that a state park has been erected around the mysterious rock.
Due to this purported connection the nearby school Carl Albert State College in the city of Poteau changed its mascot in the early 1990s from the "Trojan" to the "Viking."

Geography
Heavener is located at  (34.889108, −94.604217).

Media
There is a small weekly newspaper in the town called The Heavener Ledger. The Ledger dates back to 1904. The Ledger's website is https://ledgerlcj.com. The radio tower for KPRV FM radio sits on top of Poteau Mountain less than a half mile from the Runestone. KPRV broadcasts out of nearby Poteau and has a sister station with the same call letters on the AM band.

Economy
The Kansas City Southern Railway, which operates a major yard, crew base, and fueling facility in Heavener, has been the town's largest employer for over 70 years.  The second largest employer in Heavener is OK Foods. Beginning in 1988, this poultry company has operated a processing plant, a feed mill, and a hatchery in Heavener.

Schools
The schools are all located in the city's center and are the sole educational facilities. Heavener High School's mascot is the Wolves. School colors are purple and gold. Main activities at the school include band, choir, football, cheerleading, basketball, baseball, softball, power lifting, track, golf, soccer, drama, academic team, and jazz band.

Demographics

As of the census of 2000, there were 3,201 people, 1,113 households, and 783 families residing in the city. The racial makeup of the city was 73.79% White, 0.62% African American, 9.84% Native American, 0.16% Asian, 10.56% from other races, and 5.03% from two or more races. Hispanic or Latino of any race were 22.52% of the population.

There were 1,113 households, out of which 34.0% had children under the age of 18 living with them, 51.7% were married couples living together, 12.3% had a female householder with no husband present, and 29.6% were non-families. 25.2% of all households were made up of individuals, and 14.3% had someone living alone who was 65 years of age or older. The average household size was 2.81 and the average family size was 3.27.

In the city, the population was spread out, with 26.3% under the age of 18, 14.9% from 18 to 24, 26.2% from 25 to 44, 17.2% from 45 to 64, and 15.4% who were 65 years of age or older. The median age was 31 years. For every 100 females, there were 100.7 males. For every 100 females age 18 and over, there were 97.0 males.

The median income for a household in the city was $23,750, and the median income for a family was $28,654. Males had a median income of $19,848 versus $18,487 for females. The per capita income for the city was $11,313. About 23.6% of families and 26.3% of the population were below the poverty line, including 32.7% of those under age 18 and 12.5% of those age 65 or over.

The current mayor is Troy Dyer.

References

External links
 
 Heavener Runestone
 Heavener Public Library (Southeast Oklahoma Library System)
 Encyclopedia of Oklahoma History and Culture - Heavener
 Oklahoma Digital Maps: Digital Collections of Oklahoma and Indian Territory

Cities in Oklahoma
Cities in Le Flore County, Oklahoma
Fort Smith metropolitan area